Macamic is a ville in northwestern Quebec, Canada, in the Abitibi-Ouest Regional County Municipality. It covers 202.34 km² and had a population of 2,734 in the Canada 2011 Census.

In addition to Macamic itself, the town's territory also includes the community of Colombourg.

History
Colonization began at the time when the National Transcontinental Railway running through the Abitibi region was completed. The first pioneers, arriving circa 1913, were originally from Saint-Ignace-du-Lac, Pierreville, Stanfold, Nicolet, and Shawinigan. They settled south of Lake Macamic and the new settlement took the lake's name, often written also as Makamik. In the Algonquin language, the name Makamik means "limping beaver", from makis (crippled or disabled) and amik (beaver).

In 1914, Makamik had 100 residents. In 1915, the year the post office opened, it had grown to 300, and the following year, when the Parish of Saint-Jean-l'Évangéliste-de-Macamic was formed, there were 500 persons. By 1918, the population had jumped to 1750 and the area was incorporated as the United Township Municipality of Royal-Roussillon-et-Poularies, named after the Royal-Roussillon Regiment of Montcalm's army and after lieutenant-colonel François-Médard de Poularies, commander of this regiment.

In 1919, the village itself separated from the united township and was incorporated as Village Municipality of Macamic, having a population of 2300 persons by 1920. In 1924, Poularies Township also separated from Royal-Roussillon-et-Poularies, which became the Parish Municipality of Royal-Roussillon-de-Macamic in 1952, and officially shortened to just Macamic in 1961.

In 1955, the Village Municipality of Macamic changed its status to town (ville), and was regrouped with the Parish Municipality of Macamic on June 13, 2001, to form the new Town of Macamic. On March 2, 2002, the Municipality of Colombourg (incorporated in 1926) was merged into Macamic.

Demographics 

Population trend:
 Population in 2011: 2734 (2006 to 2011 population change: 0.3%)
 Population in 2006: 2726
 Population total in 2001: 2838
 Town of Macamic: 1519
 Parish Municipality of Macamic: 570
 Municipality of Colombourg: 749
 Population in 1996:
 Town of Macamic: 1711
 Parish Municipality of Macamic: 549
 Municipality of Colombourg: 780
 Population in 1991:
 Town of Macamic: 1833
 Parish Municipality of Macamic: 584
 Municipality of Colombourg: 799

Mother tongue:
 English as first language: 0%
 French as first language: 99.6%
 English and French as first language: 0.4%
 Other as first language: 0%

Municipal council
 Mayor: Daniel Rancourt
 Councillors: Denise Dubois, Dianne Duchesne, Marc Frappier, Rock Morin, Éric Poiré, Yvan Verville

References

Cities and towns in Quebec
Incorporated places in Abitibi-Témiscamingue
Populated places established in 1913
1913 establishments in Quebec